Joaquín Cuadras (1843–1877) was a Cuban painter. He attended the art school of Antonio Ciseri in Florence. In 1861, Cuadras met fellow artist Walter Goodman whilst copying Old Master paintings at the Uffizi Palace in Florence, and the two became friends. They travelled to Barcelona in 1862 and arrived in London a year later.

In 1864, he sat for Walter Goodman's mother, the portrait painter Julia Goodman. Later that year, he travelled to Cuba with Walter Goodman.

After returning from Cuba in 1870, Cuadras moved to Selkirk, Scotland for three years, where he found work decorating mansions for the Scottish elite. One of his most important commissions was a series of eight-panel pictures illustrating Sir Walter Scott's The Lay of the Last Minstrel. While in Scotland, Cuadras fathered a daughter with Elizabeth Christison in 1872. He named her Maria Josefita Cuadras, and she died in 1960 in Edinburgh.

Many of his best works were exhibited at galleries in Glasgow and Edinburgh.

Cuadras was represented at the Royal Academy in 1872 by his painting Mulatto Girl's Toilette, a Scene in Cuba (sold at Sotheby's, New York in 2010) and the following year he contributed two engravings The Cuban Lovers and The Mulatto Girl to The Graphic magazine. In 1874, he exhibited Return the Christening, a painting of a scene in Venice with a christening party landing from a gondola, at the International Exhibition of Fine Arts in London. This painting is currently in the collection of The General Hospital, Jersey.

Between 1868 and 1869 Cuadras was director of Academia de Dibujo de Santiago de Cuba. In 1876 he won a silver medal in an exhibition at Liceo Artístico y Literario de La Habana. He won a bronze medal in 1877 in the los juegos florales of the Liceo de Matanzas. Four of his notable Cuban works were Como de Médicis, Río Baconao, Orfila Coronado Por Una Diosa (1874), and Lección de Anatomía - the whereabouts of which are unknown today. There are examples of Cuadras' work in the Museo Bacardi in Santiago de Cuba and the Museo Nacional de Bellas Artes in Havana.

Joaquín Cuadras died in Rome on January 27, 1877.

References

External links 
 Return the Christening
 Mulatto Girl's Toilette, a Scene in Cuba

1843 births
1877 deaths
19th-century Cuban painters
19th-century male artists
Cuban expatriates in Italy
Cuban expatriates in the United Kingdom
Male painters